John William Evans may refer to:
Sir John Evans (Australian politician) (1855–1943), Premier of Tasmania, 1904–1909
John William Evans (geologist) (1857–1930), British geologist
John William Evans (Welsh politician) (1870–1906), Liberal local politician in South Wales
Jack Evans (rugby union, born 1875) (1875–1947), Wales international rugby player
John William Evans (entomologist) (1906–1990), British entomologist

See also
John Evans (disambiguation)